Arthur James Ledger Hill (26 July 1871 – 6 September 1950) was an English cricketer.

Ledger Hill was educated at Marlborough College and Jesus College, Cambridge. He played first-class cricket for Cambridge University between 1890 and 1893, and for Hampshire between 1895 and 1921. He also played three Test matches for England on their tour to South Africa in 1895-96.

Hill scored the first-ever first-class century to be scored in India. His nephew, Richard Page was also a first-class cricketer.

References

1871 births
1950 deaths
People educated at Marlborough College
Alumni of Jesus College, Cambridge
Cambridge University cricketers
England Test cricketers
English cricketers
Hampshire cricketers
I Zingari cricketers
Gentlemen of the South cricketers
Marylebone Cricket Club cricketers
Gentlemen cricketers
Gentlemen of England cricketers
Lord Hawke's XI cricketers
C. I. Thornton's XI cricketers
A. J. Webbe's XI cricketers